La Pintada; is a town and municipality in the southwest region of the Antioquia department. It is located seventy nine miles away from Medellín and is at an altitude of six hundred meters over sea level. It borders the Fredonia and Santa Bárbara municipalities to the north. The Cauca River goes through the municipality.

Places of interest
 Slopes of the Poblanco and Arma rivers
 Yellow hill
 Alejandro López railway station
 El Salto del Caballo
 Acapulco beach

Gallery

Municipalities of Antioquia Department